The Lieutenant Governor of the Andaman and Nicobar Islands is the representative of the Government of India in the Andaman and Nicobar Islands and the head of the union territory.

In 1947, India achieved independence from the United Kingdom.  After independence, the chief commissioner and, later, the lieutenant governor, has been appointed by the President of India.  The current Lieutenant Governor is Devendra Kumar Joshi. His official residence is in Raj Nivas, Port Blair.

Superintendents of Port Blair (1858–1872) 
 Henry Stuart Man, 22 January 1858 – 1858, first time
 James Pattison Walker, 1858–October 1859
 John Colpoys Haughton, October 1859 – 1862
 Robert Christopher Tytler, April 1862–February 1864
 Barnett Ford, 1864–1868
 Henry Stuart Man, 1868–1871, second time
 Frederick Lyon Playfair, 1871–1872

Chief Commissioners of the Andaman and Nicobar Islands (1872–1945) 
 Donald Martin Stewart, 1872–1875
 Charles Arthur Barwell, 1875–1878
 Thomas Cadell, 1878–1892
 Norman Mcleod Thomas Horsford, 1892–1894
 Richard Carnac Temple, 1894–1904
 William Rudolph Henry Merk, 1904–1906
 Herbert Arrott Browning, 1906–1913
 Montague William Douglas, 1913–1920
 Henry Cecil Beadon. 1920–1923
 Michael Lloyd Ferrar, 1923–1931
 John William Smith, 1931–1935
 William Alexander Cosgrave, 1935–1938
 Charles Francis Waterfall, 1938–23 March 1942
 Bucho 23 March 1942–1943, (Japanese occupation)
 A. D. Loganathan, December 1943–August 1945 (Provisional Government of Azad Hind)

Governors of the Andaman and Nicobar Islands (1945–1947) 
 Charles Francis Waterfall, 1945–1946, restored
 Noel Kennedy Patterson, 1946–15 August 1947

Chief Commissioners of the Andaman and Nicobar Islands (1946–1982) 

Following Indian independence, the Chief Commissioner of the Andaman and Nicobar Islands was the nominal head of the territory, appointed by the President of India.

 Inamul Majid, February 1946 – 1949, subordinate to the Governor to 15 August 1947
 Ajoy Kumar Ghosh, 1949–1953
 Sankar Nath Maitra, 1953–1956
 C. Ramachandran, 1956
 T. G. N. Ayyar, 1956–1958
 M. V. Rajawade, 1958–1961
 B. N. Maheshwari, 1961–1965
 B. L. Chak, 1965–1966
 Mahabir Singh, 1966–1968
 H. S. Butalia, 1968–1972
 Harmander Singh, 1972–1975
 Surendra Mohan Krishnatry, 1975–1979
 S. L. Sharma, 1979–1982

Lieutenant Governors of the Andaman and Nicobar Islands (1982—) 
 M L Kampani ,12 November 1982 – 3 December 1985
 Lt Gen Tirath Singh Oberoi (Retd), PVSM, VrC, 4 December 1985–December 1989
 Romesh Bhandari, December 1989–24 February 1990
Romesh Bhandari was appointed L G to A & N Islands but he was never sworn in as L G of these Island. T. S. Oberoi continued up to Feb. 24, 1990. Mr Gorakh Ram was Chief Secretary of these Islands at that time.
 Ranjit Singh Dayal, 25 February 1990–December 1993
 Surjit Singh Barnala, December 1990–18 March 1993
 Vakkom Purushothaman, 19 March 1993 – 18 March 1996
 Ishwari Prasad Gupta, 23 December 1996 – 25 May 2001
 Nagendra Nath Jha, 26 May 2001 – 4 January 2004
 Ramchandra "Ram" Kapse, 5 January 2004 – 30 May 2006
 Madan Mohan Lakhera, 12 February 2006 – 29 December 2006, acting (for Kapse to 30 May 2006)
 Bhopinder Singh, 29 December 2006—30 Jun 2013
 A. K. Singh, 8 July 2013 – 17 August 2016
 Jagdish Mukhi, 22 August 2016 – 7 October 2017
 Devendra Kumar Joshi, 8 October 2017 - Incumbent

See also
 Andaman and Nicobar Islands
 Governors in India

References

 http://www.worldstatesmen.org/India_BrProvinces.htm
 http://www.worldstatesmen.org/India_states.html

Government of the Andaman and Nicobar Islands
State political office-holders in India
 
A